Gerald John Philbin (born July 31, 1941) is a former American football defensive tackle and four-year starter from the University at Buffalo where he earned several honors including second-team All-American, Little All-America, and All-American Academic team.  Drafted by both the Detroit Lions of the National Football League (NFL) and the New York Jets of the American Football League (AFL) in the third round of the 1964 draft, he joined the Jets and became an immediate starter and perennial All-AFL selection at defensive end. He played stellar defense for them for nine seasons.

He was selected as an American Football League All-Star in 1968 and 1969. A ferocious pass-rusher, Philbin recorded  sacks of opposing quarterbacks in 1968, helping the Jets win the AFL Championship.  In the third AFL-NFL World Championship Game, Philbin anchored the Jets defense in limiting the Colts to seven points.

In 1973, he joined the Philadelphia Eagles for one season and finished his career in the short-lived World Football League as a member of the New York Stars in 1974 where he joined former Super Bowl III alumni George Sauer, Jr, Randy Beverly, John Dockery, John Elliott, and Vito (Babe) Parilli. He was an All-WFL selection in 1974. Philbin is a member of the All-time American Football League Team.

See also
 List of American Football League players

References

1941 births
Living people
American football defensive ends
American football defensive tackles
American Football League players
Buffalo Bulls football players
Charlotte Hornets (WFL) players
New York Jets players
New York Stars players
Philadelphia Eagles players
American Football League All-Star players
American Football League All-Time Team
Sportspeople from Pawtucket, Rhode Island
Players of American football from Rhode Island